Reginald "Reggie" Stephens (born August 28, 1987, in Dallas, Texas) is an American football center and guard who is currently a free agent. He was drafted by the Cincinnati Bengals in the seventh round of the 2010 NFL Draft. He played college football for Iowa State University. He also played for the Buffalo Bills, Chicago Bears and Baltimore Ravens.

Early life
Stephens attended and played high school football at Jesuit College Preparatory School of Dallas. His family attended all of his games and supports his choices and career.

College career
Stephens played college football at Iowa State University.

Professional career

Cincinnati Bengals
Stephens was drafted in the seventh round of the 2010 NFL Draft by the Cincinnati Bengals. He was waived on September 4, 2011.

First stint with Chicago Bears
On January 6, 2012, Stephens was signed by the Chicago Bears, as a backup for Roberto Garza.

On May 14, 2012, he was waived by the Bears.

Buffalo Bills

On October 8, 2012, he signed with the Buffalo Bills.

Chicago Bears (second stint)
On December 19, 2012, Stephens was brought back by the Bears onto the practice squad.

Baltimore Ravens
On January 8, 2013, Stephens was signed by the Ravens to the practice squad. The Ravens waived Stephens on August 29, 2014.

References

External links
Cincinnati Bengals bio

1987 births
Living people
People from Rowlett, Texas
Players of American football from Texas
Sportspeople from the Dallas–Fort Worth metroplex
African-American players of American football
American football offensive guards
American football centers
Iowa State Cyclones football players
Cincinnati Bengals players
Chicago Bears players
Buffalo Bills players
Baltimore Ravens players
Jesuit College Preparatory School of Dallas alumni
21st-century African-American sportspeople
20th-century African-American people